Copper mining in the Democratic Republic of the Congo mainly takes place in the Copper Belt of the southern Katanga Province of the Democratic Republic of the Congo.

Not all copper deposits contain significant cobalt, but nearly all cobalt in the country is sourced from copper deposits. The DRC produces about 63% of the world's cobalt, with about 80% from industrial copper mines, and the remaining 20% gathered by artisanal mining.

Geology

There are 72 economic deposits of copper/cobalt and four large mining centers. Taken together, the DRC and Zambian copper belts are the second largest global reserve of copper, about 1/3 the size of the Chilean reserve.

The DRC copper belt includes some of the highest grade copper deposits in the world. In some reserves the grades are above 5%. The ore also has high grades of cobalt and may hold 34% of the world's cobalt reserves. There are large deposits that have yet to be explored using modern technology, so the size of the reserves may be understated. Demand is growing, led by China.

History

Prehistoric mines in the Katanga belt have been found at Dikuluwe near Musonoi, Tenke-Fungurume, Kambove, Luishia, Ruashi and Etoile, and at the Naviundo and Luano archaeological sites. Monseigneur de Hemptinne watched Yeke people working at Dikuluwe as late as 1924. They worked in the dry season and stopped when the first rains arrived. The mining camp was near a stream where millet could be planted. Women and children collected malachite from the surface, while men used iron picks to excavate pits and shafts, using  fire to crack the rocks when needed. The ore would be sorted and then taken to a nearby stream for concentration before being smelted.

Commercial mining began in the 1920s, with a forcibly recruited workforce. The Union Minière constantly struggled to prevent recruits fleeing from the mines, sometimes taking refuge in Angola. Workers were mistreated and suffered badly from disease brought on by the working conditions.  The lowest death rate at the Panda, Lubumbashi, Kisanga and Musonoi work sites in 1928 was four men per month. Today, mine worker exploitation is still prevalent and instances of slave labor, and especially child labor, are still observed in the mining industry according to the 2014 U.S. Department of Labor's List of Goods Produced by Child Labor or Forced Labor.

Between 1970 and 1988 copper metal production was roughly constant at between 400,000 and 500,000 tonnes. Production then dropped steeply to under 50,000 tonnes annually between 1992 and 2001. Since then, production has steadily grown, reaching about 300,000 tonnes in 2008.

In 2005, proceeds from an oil sale to Glencore, an Anglo–Swiss multinational commodity trading and mining company, were seized as fraudulent gains as part of an investigation into corruption in the country (Allen-Mills 17 June 2008). In the course of the Congo events, Nikanor was merged into Katanga in late 2007 in a transaction valued at US$3.3 billion.

The government of the DRC began to review about 60 mining contracts in 2008, and started to release their findings to the mining companies in February 2008.
For example, TEAL, a subsidiary of African Rainbow Minerals, was asked by letter to submit their feasibility study for their Kalumines property to identify the real contribution of each of the parties "in order to achieve a fair attribution of shares".
The letter said the feasibility study should present a planning of "realisation of social actions with a visible impact".
It also said that the state-owned Gécamines should actively participate in the daily management of the operation.

In August 2009, the DRC government revoked First Quantum Minerals' (FQM) license to operate the Kolwezi tailings project, alleging "unreasonable behaviour" in negotiations to change the contract.
First Quantum had spent $750 million on acquiring and developing the property.
First Quantum took out an action against the DRC government in the International Chamber of Commerce Court of Arbitration.
In May 2010 a Congolese court ruled that FQM's Lonshi and Frontier copper mines had been awarded illegally and that they should revert to state-owned Sodimico.
According to FQM the ruling was due to FQM's decision to contest the expropriation of their Kolwezi project, which was later sold to the Kazakh mining company Eurasian Natural Resources Corporation.

Companies
The largest shareholders in most copper mines in the DRC are foreign corporations, with the Congolese state-owned Gécamines holding a minority stake in most projects. In recent years, many Chinese companies have become major holders in various copper mines in the DRC.

China Nonferrous Metal Mining Group

China Nonferrous Metal Mining Group (CNMC) is the majority owner of the Deziwa mine and Ecaille C mine.

China Railway

China Railway, or its subsidiary, China Overseas Engineering Group, is a partner in the Luishia mine, the Kalumbwe Myunga mine, and the Sicomines venture at Dikuluwe Mine and Mashamba West.

CMOC Group Limited

CMOC Group Limited, formerly known as China Molybdenum, entered the DRC in 2016 with the purchase of the Tenke Fungurume Mine. It also purchased the Kisanfu mine which is under construction. Both mines were formerly held by Freeport-McMoRan.

Gécamines

Gécamines (La Générale des Carrières et des Mines), is a state-owned mining company in the DRC. Its principal products are copper (which often accounted for 50% of export earnings), cobalt and zinc.
Copper mines in which Gécamines has a major interest include Kambove, Kipushi and Kolwezi. Gécamines also owns a copper smelter at Lubumbashi and a hydrometallurgical plant at Shituru.

The Industrial Development and Mining Corporation of Zaire (Société de développement industriel et minier du Zaire - SODIMIZA)
is an operating company for copper and its derivatives in Katanga. The company also operates cobalt and zinc. It was created in 1967 and acquired by Gécamines in 1987.

The Kababankola Mining Company (KMC) is a joint-venture between Gécamines (20%) and Tremalt (80%) with the objective of exploiting Copper and cobalt.

Glencore

The Swiss company Glencore owns a number of large copper mines, particularly after acquiring Katanga Mining as a wholly owned subsidiary. Currently, Glencore owns majority stakes in Kamoto Copper Company SARL (KCC) and DRC Copper and Cobalt Project SARL (DCC), which run several copper/cobalt mines, as well as a Mutanda Mining SARL, which runs the Mutanda Mine.

Katanga Mining produces copper and cobalt at the Kamoto Mine, which also includes the Kamoto concentrator, the Luilu metallurgical plant, the Kamoto underground mine and two oxide open pit resources in the Kolwezi district.
A joint venture of Katanga Mining (75%) and Gécamines (25%) began mining Tilwezembe, an open-pit copper and cobalt mine, in 2007.
As of 2011 Katanga Mining was 74.8% owned by Glencore.

Jinchuan Group

Metorex, based in Johannesburg, South Africa, has assets in the DRC that include the existing Kinsenda Mine, the new Ruashi copper and cobalt mine, and the Dilala East and Lubembe deposit greenfields sites.

Copper Resources Corporation is a subsidiary of Meterox.
As of November 2011 it held a 92.5% interest in the Hinoba-an Porphyry Copper project in the Philippines,
and a 75% interest in Miniere de Musoshi et Kinsenda (MMK).
MMK in turn owns the flooded Kinsenda and Musoshi copper mines in Katanga. MMK was formerly a subsidiary of Forrest Group. As of 30 November 2005 it became a subsidiary of Copper Resources Corporation.
MMK also holds the Lubembe high-grade deposit.

Jinchuan Group acquired Metorex in 2012, making it a fully owned subsidiary.

Zhejiang Huayou Cobalt

Zhejiang Huayou Cobalt holds stakes in the Luiswishi mine and Kolwezi copper mine.

Other
Afrimines Resources SPRL, based in Democratic Republic of the Congo, owns various mining resources.
In May 2008 Tiger Resources announced that it had secured the rights to explore several new and highly prospective tenements in Katanga in partnership with Afrimines Resources and Katanga Minerals Holdings.

The Eurasian Natural Resources Corporation (ENRC) has a significant presence, particularly with the Mukondo Mine asset, since its takeover of the Central African Mining and Exploration Company (CAMEX).

Mines
Copper mines in the Democratic Republic of the Congo are concentrated in the Copperbelt, in the provinces of Haut-Katanga and Lualaba, both part of the historical province of Katanga until 2015. The ownership of most mines is structured as a joint venture split between a foreign company and the DRC state-controlled miners Gécamines and Sodimico. Mines currently active in green, mines soon opening in blue, mines suspended in red.

See also 
 Mining industry of the Democratic Republic of the Congo

References

Sources

External links
 

 
 
Mining in Katanga Province
Mining-related lists
Economy of the Democratic Republic of the Congo-related lists